Khalil Ghanim Mubarak (born 12 November 1964) is a footballer from UAE who played as a centre back for Al Khaleej Club in Sharjah, and the UAE national football team. He formed along with his brother Mubarak a hard defence line for the UAE team during their careers. His one goal in the World Cup Qualification round against Qatar had assisted the team in reaching the 1990 FIFA World Cup finals in Italy. He was sent off in their final group game against Yugoslavia, which his team lost 4-1.

External links

1964 births
Living people
Emirati footballers
1984 AFC Asian Cup players
1988 AFC Asian Cup players
1990 FIFA World Cup players
United Arab Emirates international footballers
UAE Pro League players
Khor Fakkan Sports Club players
Association football defenders